Jump is an unincorporated community in Hardin County, in the U.S. state of Ohio.

History
A post office called Jump was established in 1892, and remained in operation until 1901. Jump once had its own schoolhouse.

References

Unincorporated communities in Hardin County, Ohio
1892 establishments in Ohio
Populated places established in 1892
Unincorporated communities in Ohio